The 1955 Austrian State Treaty ended the four-power occupation and recognized Austria as an independent and sovereign state. In October 1955, the Federal Assembly passed a constitutional law in which "Austria declares of her own free will her perpetual neutrality." The second section of this law stated that "in all future times Austria will not join any military alliances and will not permit the establishment of any foreign military bases on her territory." Since then, Austria has shaped its foreign policy on the basis of neutrality.

In recent years, however, Austria has begun to reassess its definition of neutrality, granting overflight rights for the UN-sanctioned action against Iraq in 1991, and, since 1995, contemplating participation in the EU's evolving security structure. Also in 1995, it joined the Partnership for Peace, and subsequently participated in peacekeeping missions in Bosnia. Discussion of possible Austrian NATO membership intensified during 1996. ÖVP and Team Stronach aim at moving closer to NATO or a European defense arrangement. SPÖ and FPÖ, in turn, believe continued neutrality is the cornerstone of Austria's foreign policy, and a majority of the population generally supports this stance.

In February 2000, Austria's foreign relations underwent controversy when the ÖVP formed a coalition with the FPÖ after the 1999 election. European governments imposed diplomatic sanctions, and the United States recalled its ambassador.
Sanctions were lifted in September 2000 after a three-member panel assessed human rights and political life in Austria.
In November 2000, the United States and Austria normalized their relations.

Austrian leaders emphasize the unique role the country plays as an East-West hub and as a moderator between industrialized and developing countries. Austria is active in the United Nations and experienced in UN peacekeeping efforts. It attaches great importance to participation in the Organisation for Economic Co-operation and Development and other international economic organizations, and it has played an active role in the Organization for Security and Cooperation in Europe (OSCE).

Vienna hosts the Secretariat of the OSCE and the headquarters of the International Atomic Energy Agency, the United Nations Industrial Development Organization, and the United Nations Drug Control Programme. Other international organizations based in Vienna include the Organization of Petroleum Exporting Countries, the Organization for International Economic Relations (OiER) and the International Institute for Applied Systems Analysis. Recently, Vienna added the preparatory commission for the Comprehensive Test Ban Treaty Organization and the Wassenaar Arrangement (a technology-transfer control agency) to the list of international organizations it hosts. Furthermore, the Permanent Secretariat of an international territorial treaty for the sustainable development of the Alps called the Alpine Convention is located in Tyrol's capital Innsbruck.

Austria traditionally has been active in "bridge-building to the east," increasing contacts at all levels with Eastern Europe and the states of the former Soviet Union. Austrians maintain a constant exchange of business representatives, investment, trade, political leaders, students, cultural groups, and tourists with the countries of central and eastern Europe. In addition, the Austrian Government and various Austrian organizations provide assistance and training to support the changes underway in the region.

Bilateral relationships
Austria maintains significant bilateral relations with several countries.

Multilateral

Africa

Americas

Asia

Europe

Oceania

See also
List of diplomatic missions in Austria
List of diplomatic missions of Austria
Federal Ministry for European and International Affairs (Austria)
Visa requirements for Austrian citizens

References

Further reading
 Horn, David Bayne. Great Britain and Europe in the eighteenth century (1967) covers 1603-1702; pp 111-43.

External links
 International − Austrian magazine on foreign policy